Masyadah is a Syrian village located in Talkalakh District, Homs.  According to the Syria Central Bureau of Statistics (CBS), Masyadah had a population of 792 in the 2004 census.

References 

Populated places in Homs Governorate